The Raid on Groton happened during King William's War, on July 27, 1694, at Groton, Massachusetts. This was one of numerous attacks against the settlement in the late 17th and early 18th centuries. The village had been raided during King Philip's War and temporarily abandoned by numerous families. It was also raided in June 1707 during Queen Anne's War.

During this extended period of repeated conflicts, both the French and English, and their respective First Nations allies, did a brisk trade in captives. They sometimes conducted high-level prisoner exchanges. Some captives were ransomed by families or communities; others were adopted by Mohawk families in the mission village of Kahnawake, or, similarly, by Huron (Wyandot) or Abenaki in other villages.

Historical context 
In 1693 the English at Boston had entered into peace and trade negotiations with the Abenaki tribes in eastern Massachusetts. The French at Quebec under Governor Frontenac wished to disrupt the negotiations and sent Claude-Sébastien de Villieu in the fall of 1693 into present-day Maine, with orders to "place himself at the head of the Acadian Indians and lead them against the English." In this period, England and France were at war in King William's War in Europe.

Villieu spent the winter at Fort Nashwaak. The Indian bands of the region were in general disagreement as to whether to attack the English or not. After discussions by Villieu and the support of Father Louis-Pierre Thury and Father Vincent Bigot (at Pentagouet), they went on the offensive.

Raid 
Villieu attacked the English settlement of Oyster River (now Durham, New Hampshire) with about 250 Abenaki Indians, composed of two main groups of warriors from the Penobscot and Norridgewock, under command of their sagamore Bomazeen (or Bomoseen). A number of Maliseet from Medoctec, led by Assacumbuit, also took part in the attack. Fr. Simon-Gérard had dissuaded most of his followers from participating.

Following the raid on Oyster River, "the savages of Pentagoet under Taxous and Madockawando, piqued at the little booty, and the few captives taken," continued to other settlements. Some 40 warriors traveled to Groton, Massachusetts, which they raided on the morning of July 27, 1694.  They killed some 20 people (seven in the Longley family) and took captive some 13 others, including three Longley children. Betty Longley died while being taken overland to Montreal, and John Longley was held by the Abenaki.

The oldest, 21-year-old Lydia Longley, was eventually taken to Montreal by the Pennacook, to whom she had been traded not long after the raid. In that city she was ransomed by a wealthy Frenchman who assisted captives, tutored and converted to Catholicism, and baptized as Lydia-Madeleine in 1696. That year she entered the non-cloistered Congregation of Notre Dame. Sister Lydia-Madeleine had most of her career in Montreal but later served as the superior at a mission at Sainte-Famille, Île d’Orléans, near the city of Quebec. In the mid-20th century, she became known as the First American Nun, after a popular children's book of that title published in 1958.

Consequences 
After the successful raid on Oyster River and Groton, Claude-Sébastien de Villieu joined Acadian Governor de Villebon as the commander of Fort Nashwaak, capital of Acadia.

See also 
Military history of the Maliseet people

References 
Endnotes

Sources:

 The address of C. Alice Baker – History and Proceedings of the Pocumtuck Valley Memorial Association, Volume 4, p. 401
 Jeremy Belknap, The History of New Hampshire, ed. John Farmer (Dover, N.H.: S.C. Stevens and Ela & Wadleigh, 1831)
 Samuel Adams Drake, The Border Wars of New England Commonly called King William's and Queen Anne's Wars (Williamstown, Mass: Corner House, 1973), 96.
Montague Chamberlain, "A French Account of the Raid upon the New England Frontier in 1694", Acadiensis: A Journal of the Maritime Provinces, 1901, pp. 249–266
 Jan K. Herman, "Massacre at Oyster River," New Hampshire Profiles, October 1976, 50.
 Jan K. Herman, Massacre on the Northern New England Frontier, 1689–1694 (master's thesis, University of New Hampshire, 1966), 43.
 Thomas Hutchinson, The History of the Colony and Province of Massachusetts Bay (originally published 1764–1828; reprint, Cambridge: Harvard University Press, 1936), 2:55.
 Cotton Mather, Decennium Luctuosum (Boston, 1699); reprinted in Magnalia Christi Americana (London, 1702), 86.
 Kenneth M. Morrison, The Embattled Northeast (Berkeley: University of California Press, 1984), 128.
 Francis Parkman, Count Frontenac and New France under Louis XIV, vol. 2 of France and England in North America (1877; reprint, New York: The Library of America, 1983)
 Rev. John Pike, Journal of the Rev. John Pike, of Dover, N.H., ed. Rev. A.H. Quint (Cambridge: Press of John Wilson and Son, 1876)
 Everett S. Stackpole, History of New Hampshire (New York: The American Historical Society, 1926), 1:182.
 John Clarence Webster, Acadia at the End of the 17th Century: Letters, Journals and Memoirs of Joseph Robineau de Villebon, Commandant in Acadia, 1690–1700, and Other Contemporary Documents, Saint John, N.B.: New Brunswick Museum, 1934–1979, p. 56, at Our Roots/Nos Racines, Canada's Local Histories Online
  William L. Wolkovich – Valkavicius, “The Groton Indian Raid of 1694 and Lydia Longley”, Historical Journal of Massachusetts, Volume 30, No. 2 (Summer 2002).

External links 
Samuel Abbott Green, M.D., Groton during the Indian Wars, 1883, full text online about period of King Philip's War, at US GenWebArchives

Military history of Acadia
Military history of Nova Scotia
Military history of New England
Military history of Canada
King William's War
Battles in Massachusetts
Battles involving England
Battles involving France
Conflicts in 1694
17th century in Canada
New France
Military raids
1694 in North America
Colonial Massachusetts